Suzanne Maddock (born 13 February 1976 in New Brighton, Wirral) is an English actress, singer and voice actress. Suzanne has been an industry professional since 1994, working in both TV and Film. She first appeared in the ITV police procedural drama The Bill as PC Cass Rickman from 1999 to 2002. Her character was killed off in the highly rated Sun Hill Serial Killer storyline.

Since leaving The Bill Suzanne has done little work on TV. She had previously appeared a central character in later episodes of Hetty Wainthropp Investigates, starring opposite Dominic Monaghan as Janet Frazer, for 10 episodes between 1997 and 1998. She also guest starred in Casualty, Silent Witness, and appeared in the films Land and Freedom and Stella Does Tricks.

In 2017 Suzanne Maddock shared her memories of working on The Bill and of her career in general in a 45-minute interview for "The Bill Podcast"

References

External links

1976 births
Living people
English television actresses
English film actresses